POLO HAT is an end-to-end communications exercise for United States nuclear command and control forces.

See also
GIANT BALL - an Airborne Launch Control System (ALCS) exercise

References

United States nuclear command and control
Military exercises involving the United States